Bommalaramaram (or B. Ramaram) is a village in Yadadri Bhuvanagiri district of the Indian state of Telangana. It is located in Bommalaramaram mandal of Bhongir division, Also a part of Hyderabad Metropolitan Region and Also RRR (Regional Ring Road) going through this area, Yadagirigutta New Bypass 4 Lanes road also pass from here.

References

Villages in Yadadri Bhuvanagiri district
Mandal headquarters in Yadadri Bhuvanagiri district